The 2013–14 Miami RedHawks men's basketball team  represented Miami University during the 2013–14 NCAA Division I men's basketball season. The RedHawks, led by second year head coach John Cooper, played their home games at Millett Hall as members of the East Division of the Mid-American Conference. They finished the season 13–18, 8–10 in MAC play to finish in fourth place in the East Division. They advanced to the second round of the MAC tournament where they lost to Ohio.

Season

Preseason
Head coach John Cooper announced the RedHawks' full season schedule on September 3, 2013. The team's non-conference schedule was highlighted by trips to Notre Dame, Arizona State, and Xavier, and a home game against Southern Illinois. For the conference slate, the RedHawks schedule home-and-home series with Akron, Bowling Green, Buffalo, Kent State, Ohio, Central Michigan, and Western Michigan, while visiting Ball State and Northern Illinois and playing host to Toledo and Eastern Michigan.

The RedHawks opened their season with one exhibition game against Division II opponent Northwood. Miami squeaked by with a close 76–71 win, with the Timberwolves nearly mounting a second half comeback. Sophomore Willie Moore scored 16 points to lead the RedHawks.

Roster

Schedule and results
Source: 

|-
!colspan=9 style="background:#C60808; color:#080808;"| Exhibition

|-
!colspan=9 style="background:#C60808; color:#080808;"| Non-conference games

|-
!colspan=9 style="background:#C60808; color:#080808;"| Conference games

|-
!colspan=9 style="background:#C60808; color:#080808;"| MAC tournament

References

Miami
Miami RedHawks men's basketball seasons